Brachyopa tabarkensis is a European species of hoverflies.

Distribution
Tunisia.

References

Diptera of Africa
Eristalinae
Insects described in 2002